Socket 6 was a 486-generation CPU socket, a slightly modified version of the more common Socket 3. It was used in a few motherboards.

Intel designed this new standard near the end of the 80486's market life, and therefore few motherboards were produced that used it, especially as the Socket 3 standard was already sufficient.

See also
 List of Intel microprocessors

References

Socket 006